Mast Gul (Urdu:), (born as Haroon Khan), is a Kashmiri Islamic militant  operating in Indian administered state Jammu and Kashmir during 1995. Gul is also accused for carrying out "2014 Peshawar hotel attack". He is a resident of Khawaja town of Peshawar. He, along with his associates, entered the Charar-e-Sharief shrine of Sheikh Noor-ud-din Wali at Charar-i-Sharief in 1995. To avoid any damage to holy Shrine, he was offered a safe passage by India Administration, which he refused. All holed up militants started building bunkers inside the town which resulted in migration of all inhabitants of Charar-i-Sharief to different areas of Kashmir valley. The town was cracked down by Indian troopers for almost a month with no results. With the result, Gul and his associated got concentrated inside Shrine and Khanqah. During intervening night of 11 and 12 May 1995, shrine and Khanqah mysteriously caught fire, forcing holed up militants to come out in open. Gul managed to escape unhurt and was spotted in Pakistan Administered Kashmir.

In 2001, he was disassociated from Hizbul Mujahideen following his involvement in Peshawar attack which was executed by Tehrik-i-Taliban.

Presently 
The residents of Charar-i-Sharief say that he was helped by local Militants but BJP MP Jaswant Singh said he was escorted all the way to the LoC during his escape.
He surfaced in Muzzafarabad on August 2, 1995.

His name figured in the attacks carried out by Tehrik-i-Taliban Pakistan in Pakistan's Peshawar areas and is believed to be the commander of the same outfit.

References

People from Peshawar